Christen Mikkelsen Kold (sometimes spelled Kristen or Cristen; 29 March 1816 — 6 April 1870) was a Danish teacher, notable for creating the Danish Folk high school system, for non-degree education of adults.

Kold was born in Thisted, Jutland.

Unsatisfied with the education system of Denmark at the time, he founded a school in Ryslinge in 1851, which later became a model for the folk high-school system.  His work has to be seen in context with that of N. F. S. Grundtvig. He associated with Morten Eskesen.

Kold died in Dalum, Funen.

References

External links 
 UNESCO biography

1816 births
1870 deaths
People from Thisted
Danish educators